Francis Speed (13 November 1849 – 5 March 1906) was a Barbadian cricketer. He played in one first-class match for the Barbados cricket team in 1871/72.

See also
 List of Barbadian representative cricketers

References

External links
 

1849 births
1906 deaths
Barbadian cricketers
Barbados cricketers
People from Saint John, Barbados